Shining is a Swedish black metal band formed in 1996 by Niklas Kvarforth in Halmstad, Sweden. The band's music contains depressive undertones, which include personal and suicide-themed lyrics.

The band's name does not refer to the book The Shining or the film based on it, but rather it means "the path to enlightenment", according to Kvarforth.

History

Kvarforth is the main composer and vocalist of the band and started the band when he was twelve. By the time Kvarforth was fourteen, Shining had released their first EP Submit to Selfdestruction (1998) on which he played guitars and bass. It was not until the band released their first album, Within Deep Dark Chambers (2000), that Kvarforth became the band's vocalist.

The band released two more albums Livets ändhållplats (2001) and Angst, Självdestruktivitetens Emissarie (2002), before splitting up in August 2004. Their fourth album, The Eerie Cold (2005), was supposed to be their last, but the band reformed later the same year with a new line-up capable of live shows.

Kvarforth disappeared in July 2006 and a rumor was spread he was presumed to have committed suicide. On 23 August 2006 the band posted a statement on their website declaring Kvarforth had disappeared. The band was said to continue with a new singer named “Ghoul,” as one of the wishes from Kvarforth.

At a concert that took place on 3 February 2007, at Diezel in Halmstad, Sweden, “Ghoul” was revealed to be Kvarforth. The concert was violent in nature, with Kvarforth occasionally fighting the audience and the guest vocalists (Attila Csihar, Maniac and Nattefrost).

The band released their fifth album in 2007, Halmstad (Niklas angående Niklas), a reference to Kvarforth's hometown.

A compilation album entitled, 8½ – Feberdrömmar I Vaket Tillstånd (2013), was released that featured re-recorded songs from 2001–2002 and different vocalists for 5/6 tracks.

The band's ninth album entitled, IX – Everyone, Everything, Everywhere, Ends, was released on 21 April 2015.

The band's tenth album, X – Varg Utan Flock, was released on 5 January 2018.

Music

Musically, Shining went from black metal with doom influences on their earlier work to a more progressive extreme metal sound with extensive use of clean guitars, pentatonic scales, guitar solos, different vocal styles and often tempo shifts and odd time signatures. Shining's music also contains several movie samples from films such as Prozac Nation, She's So Lovely, and American Psycho.

Shining openly promotes suicide and self-harm in all its forms (e.g. drugs) in their lyrics. The founder of the band, Niklas Kvarforth, has claimed, with contentment, there have been some cases of people committing suicide at least partially under the influence of Shining's music.

Vocalist Niklas Kvarforth wanted to "force feed" his listeners "with self-destructive and suicidal imagery and lyrics". In the beginning he used the term "suicidal black metal" for his music to separate himself from the "mediocre worms". However, he stopped using the term in 2001 because it had begun to be used by a slew of other bands, who he felt had misinterpreted his vision and were using the music as a kind of therapy rather than a weapon against the listener as Kvarforth intended. He said that he "wouldn't call Shining a black metal band" and called the "suicidal black metal" term a "foolish idea".

In a 2014 interview, Kvarforth insisted that "metal is bullshit" and insisted that Shining's music is accurately described as "evil fucking music."

Members

Current members
 Niklas Kvarforth (a.k.a. "Ghoul") – guitars, keyboards (1996–2004, 2004–present), lead vocals (2000–2004, 2004–present), bass (1996–2000)
 Peter Huss – guitars (2005–present)
 Alex "Impaler" Friberg – bass (2022–present)
 Nicholas Barker – drums (2022–present)
 Charles Hedger – guitars (2022–present)

Former members
Vocalists
 Robert Ayddan (1998)
 Andreas Classen (1999–2000)

Guitarists
 Håkan "Inisis" Ollars (2002)
 John Doe (2005–2006)
 Andreas Casado (2005–2006)
 Fredric "Wredhe" Gråby (2006–2011)
 Sebastiaan Bats (2011)
 Euge Valovirta (2012–2017)
 Teloch (2018)
 Benny Bats (2017–2019)
 Silmaeth (2019)
 Kevin Storm (2019–2022)

Bassists
 Tusk (2000–2001)
 Johan Hallander (2005–2007)
 Phil A. Cirone (2001–2005, 2007–2008)
 Andreas Larssen (2008–2010)
 Christian Larsson (2010–2016)

Drummers
 Ted "Impaler" Wedebrand (1998–2001)
 Jan Axel "Hellhammer" Blomberg (2001–2004)
 Rickard "Rille" Schill (2008–2010)
 Ludwig Witt (2005–2007, 2011–2012)
 Jarle "Uruz" Byberg (2007–2008, 2016–2017)
 Rainer Tuomikanto (2012–2016)

Timeline

Discography

Studio albums 
 Within Deep Dark Chambers (2000)
 Livets ändhållplats (2001)
 III – Angst, självdestruktivitetens emissarie (2002)
 IV – The Eerie Cold (2005)
 V – Halmstad (2007)
 VI – Klagopsalmer  (2009)
 VII – Född förlorare (2011)
 Redefining Darkness (2012)
 IX – Everyone, Everything, Everywhere, Ends (2015)
 X – Varg Utan Flock (2018)
 Oppression MMXVIII (2020)

EPs and compilations 
 Submit to Selfdestruction (EP, 1998)
 Dolorian/Shining (Split EP, 2004)
 Through Years of Oppression (Rarity compilation, 2004)
 The Darkroom Sessions (Rehearsal compilation, 2004)
 Shining/Den Saakaldte (Split EP, 2008)
 Lots of Girls Gonna Get Hurt (EP, 2012)
 8 ½ – Feberdrömmar i vaket tillstånd (Compilation, 2013)
 In the Eerie Cold Where All the Witches Dance (Split EP, 2013)
 Shining on the Enslaved (Split EP with, Enslaved, 2015)
 Fiende (EP, 2017)

Singles 
 "Förtvivlan, min arvedel" (2011)

Music videos 
 "Förtvivlan, min arvedel" (2011)
 "Tillsammans är vi allt" (2012)
 "Vilja & Dröm" (2015)

References

External links

 

Swedish black metal musical groups
Musical groups established in 1996
Season of Mist artists